Chang Ping-chiang (1902 – 21 January 1975) was a Chinese politician. She was among the first group of women elected to the Legislative Yuan in 1948. Remaining in China after the Civil War, she later served as a delegate to the third National People's Congress.

Biography
A member of the Kuomintang, she became the head of women's affairs in the Shanghai branch of the party. She also became personal secretary to Soong Ching Ling, the wife of Kuomintang leader Sun Yat-sen and served as headmistress of Shanghai Huiping Middle School.

Returning to Sichuan, Chang became chair of the provincial Women's Movement Committee of the Kuomintang and headmistress of Guang'an County Girls' Middle School. She was appointed to the Sichuan Province Provisional Senate and in the 1948 elections for the Legislative Yuan, was elected as a women's representative of trade unions. After being elected, she sat on the Education and Culture, Labour and Political and Local Autonomy committees. She remained in China after the Chinese Civil War and became a member of the Sichuan Provincial committee of the Chinese People's Political Consultative Conference. In 1964–65 she was a delegate to the 3rd National People's Congress. She died in 1975.

References

1902 births
20th-century Chinese educators
20th-century Chinese women politicians
Members of the Kuomintang
Members of the 1st Legislative Yuan
Delegates to the 3rd National People's Congress
1975 deaths